The 1981 FIS Freestyle Skiing World Cup was the second World Cup season in freestyle skiing organised by International Ski Federation. The season started on 16 January 1981 and ended on 22 March 1981. This season included four disciplines: aerials, moguls, ballet and combined.

Men

Ballet

Moguls

Aerials

Combined

Ladies

Ballet

Moguls

Aerials

Combined

Men's standings

Overall 

Standings after 33 races.

Moguls 

Standings after 8 races.

Aerials 

Standings after 8 races.

Ballet 

Standings after 9 races.

Combined 

Standings after 8 races.

Ladies' standings

Overall 

Standings after 33 races.

Moguls 

Standings after 8 races.

Aerials 

Standings after 8 races.

Ballet 

Standings after 9 races.

Combined 

Standings after 8 races.

References

FIS Freestyle Skiing World Cup
World Cup